UFC 222: Cyborg vs. Kunitskaya was a mixed martial arts event produced by the Ultimate Fighting Championship that was held on March 3, 2018, at the T-Mobile Arena in Paradise, Nevada, part of the Las Vegas metropolitan area.

UFC 222 features in the upcoming film Road House with filming taking place at the T-Mobile Arena during UFC 285.

Background
A UFC Featherweight Championship bout between champion Max Holloway and former UFC Lightweight Champion Frankie Edgar was expected to serve as the event headliner. The pairing was initially expected to take place three months earlier at UFC 218. However, Edgar pulled out of the fight citing an eye injury. In turn, Holloway pulled out of this bout on February 3, due to a leg injury and the matchup was scrapped.

On the same day of Holloway's withdrawal, the UFC reportedly pursued a UFC Bantamweight Championship bout between current champion T.J. Dillashaw and former champion Cody Garbrandt to headline this event, in what would be a rematch of their UFC 217 encounter, in which Dillashaw recaptured the title with a TKO win. However, Dillashaw declined the offer citing a few reasons: the recent birth of his first child, not being in a training camp, disbelief that Garbrandt deserves the title shot, as well as a targeted UFC Flyweight Championship challenge against the champion Demetrious Johnson (who was, at the time, recovering from a surgery).

On February 7, it was reported that a UFC Women's Featherweight Championship bout between current champion Cris Cyborg (who is also a former Strikeforce Women's Featherweight Champion and Invicta FC Featherweight Champion) and former Invicta FC Bantamweight Champion Yana Kunitskaya would headline the event. Edgar remained on the card, facing Brian Ortega in the co-main event.

A bantamweight bout between former UFC Flyweight Championship challenger and The Ultimate Fighter: Team Bisping vs. Team Miller bantamweight winner John Dodson and Pedro Munhoz is expected to take place at the event. The pairing was originally scheduled to take place one month earlier at UFC Fight Night: Machida vs. Anders but was scrapped from the event after Munhoz missed weight and Dodson did not agree to fight at a catchweight.

Bobby Green was expected to face Beneil Dariush at the event, but pulled out on February 14 due to injury. He was replaced by promotional newcomer Alexander Hernandez.

This event had five split decisions, making it the most split decision bouts in UFC history. UFC 274 in May 2022 also tied this record.

Results

Bonus awards
The following fighters were awarded $50,000 bonuses:
Fight of the Night: Sean O'Malley vs. Andre Soukhamthath
Performance of the Night: Brian Ortega and Alexander Hernandez

Reported payout
The following is the reported payout to the fighters as reported to the Nevada State Athletic Commission. It does not include sponsor money and also does not include the UFC's traditional "fight night" bonuses. The total disclosed payout for the event was $2,103,000.
 Cris Cyborg: $500,000 (no win bonus) def. Yana Kunitskaya: $100,000
 Brian Ortega: $200,000 (includes $100,000 win bonus) def. Frankie Edgar: $195,000
 Sean O'Malley: $44,000 (includes $22,000 win bonus) def.  Andre Soukhamthath: $19,000
 Andrei Arlovski: $275,000 (no win bonus) def. Stefan Struve: $77,000
 Ketlen Vieira: $60,000 (includes $30,000 win bonus) def.  Cat Zingano: $35,000
 Mackenzie Dern: $50,000 (includes $25,000 win bonus) def. Ashley Yoder: $12,000
 Alexander Hernandez: $26,000 (includes $13,000 win bonus) def. Beneil Dariush: $48,000
 John Dodson: $82,000 (includes $41,000 win bonus) def.  Pedro Munhoz: $34,000
 C.B. Dollaway: $92,000 (includes $46,000 win bonus) def. Hector Lombard: $62,000
 Zak Ottow: $36,000 (includes $18,000 win bonus) def.  Mike Pyle: $55,000
 Cody Stamann: $40,000 (includes $20,000 win bonus) def. Bryan Caraway: $21,000
 Jordan Johnson: $28,000 (includes $14,000 win bonus) def.  Adam Milstead: $12,000

See also
List of UFC events
2018 in UFC
List of current UFC fighters

References

Ultimate Fighting Championship events
2018 in mixed martial arts
March 2018 sports events in the United States
Mixed martial arts in Las Vegas
Events in Paradise, Nevada